The Entschiedene Linke (Determined Left) was communist political current formed by Karl Korsch and Ernst Schwarz in 1926. It initially attracted 7,000 members.

Their political positions were in all important issues identical to those of the Communist Workers' Party of Germany and during their congress of 4–6 June 1927 they decided unanimously to join them.

References

1926 establishments in Germany
1927 disestablishments in Germany
Defunct communist parties in Germany
Left communist organizations
Political parties disestablished in 1927
Political parties established in 1926